Misguided Behavior is an American drama film written by Victor Cobb and directed by Carl Payne and Avery O Williams. The film stars Carl Payne, Khalil Kain, Towanda Braxton, Elijah Johnson, Princeton Perez and Malek Payne. It was released in 2017, by Studio 11 Films and November 3, 2018, on digital platforms

Plot
Misguided Behavior is a horror story affecting kids every day in schools across the country. Through Kevin's eyes, we are taken on an emotional roller coaster ride as we discover what lies beneath his teenage fears as he and his peers cope with being teased, abused and dismissed daily by their classmates. The movie's shocking end leads to the paralyzing truth about his real family and leads to his ultimate decision.

Cast
 Khalil Kain as Michael Miller
 Valencia Wilson as Jessica Miller
 Carl Payne as Benjamin Fields
 Doris Morgado as Molly Fields
 Clifton Powell as Captain Rogers
 Malek Payne as Lance Fields
 Elijah Johnson as Kevin Miller
 Mike Martin as Stanley
 Princetón Perez as Christopher Arnold
 Towanda Braxton as Officer Payne

Production
Principal photography began on July 27, 2016, in Las Vegas and wrapped August 11, 2016.

See also
List of black films of the 2010s

References

2017 films
2010s English-language films
American sports drama films
Hood films
2010s American films